() is a Tibetan term that means "mirror", "looking glass".

Meaning and significance 
The mirror is an ancient symbol throughout Indian religions. In Indian iconography it may be understood as a symbol for clarity, wholesome or complete perception, and 'primordial purity' of the mindstream or consciousness.

Tantric Buddhism 

As the mirror, so the mind. The mirror as the mind, following Yogacara, reflects quality and form, though it is not directly altered and is 'beyond all attributes and qualities'.

In an essay accompanying the curatorial notes of an exhibition for the  xylograph on silk entitled Offerings to Mahakala, which depicts an 'array of ritual offerings' to the  Mahakala, Sawyer notes the importance of 'mirror' iconography to the :

The mirror motif is pervasive throughout Buddhist literature and is important to traditions of Dzogchen. A number of texts use the mirror motif in their title, such as The Mirror of the Heart of Vajrasattva which is one of the Seventeen Tantras of the Upadesha.

Akshobhya 
The mirror is part of the iconography of Akshobhya, one of the Five Tathagatas, who is the embodiment of 'mirror knowledge' (refer ).

See also 
 
 (Tibetan) mirror armour
 Thangka
 Toli

Notes

References

Bibliography 

 
   (Print)  (Online)

External links 
  - newspaper of the International Dzogchen Community established by Namkhai Norbu

Dzogchen
Mirrors
Tibetan Buddhism
Tibetan words and phrases